Michael Gregory Jackson (born August 28, 1953 in New Haven, Connecticut) is an American guitarist and composer working in jazz, R&B, avant-garde, rock, blues, and free jazz. Early in his career, he used his given name, Michael Gregory Jackson. In 1983, when he signed with Island Records, Michael dropped Jackson and recorded under Michael Gregory to prevent mix-ups with the name of pop singer Michael Jackson. In 2013, he returned to using his full name Michael Gregory Jackson.

During the 1970s and '80s, he worked with avant-garde jazz musicians Oliver Lake, and Baikida Carroll.

He worked with playwright Ntozake Shange, poet Jessica Hagedorn, and poet Thulani Davis at the Public Theater, New York City. Following this he began working more in rock, jazz fusion, and R&B. He worked with Walter Becker of Steely Dan. In 1983 Nile Rodgers produced his album Situation-X for Island Records.

In 2013 he formed Michael Gregory Jackson's Clarity Quartet and Michael Gregory Jackson's Clarity TRiO. His groups have included Anthony Davis, Bob Moses, David Murray, Jerome Harris, Julius Hemphill, Mark Helias, Mark Trayle, Marty Ehrlich, Wadada Leo Smith, and Will Calhoun.

Discography

As leader
 Clarity (Bija, 1977)
 Karmonic Suite (Improvising Artists, 1978)
 Gifts (Arista Novus, 1979)
 Heart & Center (Arista Novus, 1979)
 Cowboys, Cartoons & Assorted Candy (Enja, 1982)
 Situation X (Island, 1983)
 What to Where (RCA Novus, 1988)
 The Way We Used to To Do (Tiptoe, 1990)
 Red (Golden, 1998)
 Towards the Sun (Golden, 2002)
 After Before (Golden, 2015)
 Endogeny & Exogamy (Ethnicity Against the Error, 2015)
 Spirit Signal Strata (Golden, 2017)
 WHENUFINDITUWILLKNOW (Golden, 2019)

As sideman
With Oliver Lake
 Holding Together (Black Saint, 1976)
 Life Dance of Is (Arista Novus, 1978)
 Shine! (Arista Novus, 1979)
 Plug It (Gramavision, 1983)
 Zaki (hat ART, 1992)

With Wadada Leo Smith
 Spiritual Dimensions (Cuneiform, 2009)
 Heart's Reflections (Cuneiform, 2011)
 Najwa (TUM, 2017)

With others
 Pheeroan akLaff, Fits Like a Glove (Gramavision, 1983)
 Deanna Bogart, New Address (Viceroots, 1996)
 Matthew Shipp, Matthew Shipp Plays the Music of Allen Lowe (Constant Sorrow, 2015)

References

External links
 Official site

American jazz guitarists
Novus Records artists
Enja Records artists
1953 births
Living people
Musicians from New Haven, Connecticut
Guitarists from Connecticut
20th-century American guitarists
Jazz musicians from Connecticut
Improvising Artists Records artists